Justine Braisaz-Bouchet (born 4 July 1996) is a French biathlete, Olympic champion in the 12.5 km mass start at the 2022 Beijing Games and medalist at the Winter Olympics 2018 and World Championships.

Biography 
Justine Braisaz began her biathlon career at the Saisies Sports Club. She quickly moved to the Nordic section to practice cross-country skiing and biathlon. During the 2011/2012 season, in the Cadette U16 category, she won the French Championship of cross-country skiing and the French Championship of Biathlon, thanks to her speed on skis. She moved to Biathlon fully in the following year representing the Junior category (U19).

During the 2012/2013 season, the first year in this category, Justine Braisaz was selected for the 2013 Junior World Championships in Obertilliach, Austria. She finished 46th in the individual race and 71st in the sprint.

The following year, she was promoted to the highest class at the Junior World Championships in Presque Isle (USA). She finished the individual race ranked 29th, 5th place in the sprint, and 15th in pursuit. In the relay, she placed 6th with partners Coline Varcin and Chloé Chevalier.

In the same year (2012/2013), she participated in the European Championships held in Nové Město, Czech Republic. She ranked 12th in the individual race, 18th in the sprint, 14th in the pursuit, and 8th in the mixed relay with Chloé Chevalier, Dany Chavoutier, and Clément Dumont. At the French Championships held in Prémanon in December 2013, she won two French Champion titles (Sprint and Pursuit). In March, she climbed into second place in the Mass Start behind Julie Cardon during the French Biathlon Championships. Her progress was of such a magnitude that she managed to earn her place to compete with the best French biathletes in the summer events of the Biathlon Summer Tour.

For the 2014/2015 season, she joined the French Youth / Junior Biathlon Team. In the first stage of the 2014/2015 season of the IBU Cup in Beitostølen, Norway, Justine Braisaz took her first podium finish with a second place in the second sprint. The day before, she finished 10th in the sprint event. This was her first international podium, and as a result, she was selected for the Biathlon World Cup.

Justine Braisaz made her Biathlon World Cup debut on 12 December 2014 in Hochfilzen (2014/2015 season), Norway. She ranked 17th in the sprint, becoming the youngest athlete in the world's top 20. The next day she placed 9th in the relay with her French teammates; Marine Bolliet, Enora Latuillière, and Anaïs Bescond.  A week later, she improved her best performance by finishing 14th in the Pokljuka sprint and qualifying for the Mass Start with the top 30 biathletes. She set a new record by becoming the youngest athlete lined up on a Mass Start at only 18 years and 5 months.

She earned her first podium in her World Cup career in Oberhof, Germany, by achieving second place in the women's relay on 7 January 2015 with her teammates; Marine Bolliet, Marie Dorin-Habert and Anaïs Bescond. On 13 March 2015, at the 2015 World Championships in Kontiolahti, Finland, she won her first medal, silver, for the women's 4 x 6 km relay with Anaïs Bescond, Enora Latuillière and Marie Dorin-Habert. At the French Biathlon Championships in La Féclaz, she won the relay title with Julia Simon and Marine Bolliet. The following year, at the world championships in Oslo, Norway, she won another silver medal in the same event with Anaïs Bescond, Anaïs Chevalier, and Marie Dorin-Habert. She also achieved her best individual result when she finished 12th place in the Mass Start Competition. A week later, at the final round of the IBU World Cup season in Khanty-Mansiysk, Russia, she earned her first top 10 result with a 4th-place finish in the sprint event. She finished the season with a 10th-place finish in the pursuit event, which allowed her to finish her second world cup season in the 21st position overall.

At the 2016 Biathlon Championships in Méribel, France, she earned the title of French Champion by winning the Mass Start even in the U21 category. During the preseason 2016–2017, she won the sprint at the Norwegian Championships in Sjusjøen, Norway, ahead of Norway's Tiril Eckhoff and Ukraine's Julia Dzhyma. She won her first individual World Cup podium on 9 December 2016, at the Pokljuka (Slovenia) sprint, the second event of the World Cup, finishing second by 3 seconds behind Germany's Laura Dahlmeier: she was only 20 years old.

Biathlon results
All results are sourced from the International Biathlon Union.

Olympic Games
2 medals (1 gold, 1 bronze)

World Championships
4 medals (2 silver, 2 bronze)

*During Olympic seasons, competitions are only held for those events not included in the Olympic program.
**The single mixed relay was added as an event in 2019.

Junior/Youth World Championships

World Cup
World Cup rankings

Individual victories
5 victories (2 In, 3 MS); victories at Winter Olympics are not counted as World Cup victories, but are listed here.

Relay victories

7 victories

Personal life
In 2020, Braisaz married her coach and biathlete, Julien Bouchet.

References

External links

1996 births
Living people
French female biathletes
Biathlon World Championships medalists
Olympic biathletes of France
Biathletes at the 2018 Winter Olympics
Biathletes at the 2022 Winter Olympics
Olympic gold medalists for France
Olympic bronze medalists for France
Olympic medalists in biathlon
Medalists at the 2018 Winter Olympics
Medalists at the 2022 Winter Olympics
Sportspeople from Albertville
21st-century French women